João Pedro Loureiro da Costa (born 26 March 2000), better known as Costinha, is a Portuguese professional footballer who plays as a rightback for Rio Ave.

Professional career
Costinha is a youth product of Cavalões, Aveleda, Porto, Braga, Palmeiras and Rio Ave. He signed his first professional contract with Rio Ave on 16 May 2018. Costinha made his professional debut with Rio Ave in a 2-0 Primeira Liga loss to Gil Vicente F.C. on 29 November 2020.

International career
Costinha is a youth international for Portugal, having played up to the Portugal U21s.

References

External links
 
 
 Rio Ave Profile
 

2000 births
Living people
People from Póvoa de Varzim
Portuguese footballers
Portugal under-21 international footballers
Portugal youth international footballers
Rio Ave F.C. players
Primeira Liga players
Campeonato de Portugal (league) players
Association football fullbacks
Sportspeople from Porto District